Jeffrey Michael Lieber is an American screenwriter for both television and film. He is credited as a co-creator of the television series Lost. In addition to writing for television and film, Lieber also blogs at the website dailykos. His blog posts, which appear as "diaries" rather than front-page posts, typically have a satirical take on the news.

Early life
He was born in Evanston, Illinois, United States and attended Evanston Township High School. He attended the University of Illinois at Urbana–Champaign and earned a BFA in acting from the Department of Theatre.

Career
Lieber is credited on the films Tuck Everlasting and Tangled, as well as having been creator/executive producer for unaired TV pilots for Fox Broadcasting Company (2004) and Sony Television in (2008).

ABC hired Lieber, based on his pitch with studio Spelling Television, to write a pilot for Lost. Lieber's initial pitch for the series, then titled Nowhere, was a realistic drama series heavily influenced by Lord of the Flies and Cast Away. As the project developed, ABC soured on the direction they'd given Lieber, and approached J. J. Abrams and Damon Lindelof, who had an overall deal with their own studio, to rewrite. An industry-standard arbitration was triggered by the competing drafts and the Writers Guild of America (WGA) ultimately recognized Lieber as co-creator of the show (Lieber shares story credit with Abrams and Lindelof on the pilot). Aside from his initial pilot scripts, Lieber had no further input into Lost. Lieber and the Lost writing staff won the Writers Guild of America (WGA) Award for Best Dramatic Series at the February 2006 ceremony for their work on the first and second seasons.

In 2010, Miami Medical was canceled after 13 episodes. From 2011 to 2013, he served as an Executive Producer and Showrunner on the USA Network show Necessary Roughness. He was the co-showrunner and an executive producer on NCIS: New Orleans until 2015. He has also written for Lucifer, Charmed and created the YouTube series Impulse.

References

External links
 
 Scripts & Scribes Interview with Jeffrey Lieber

1969 births
Living people
Evanston Township High School alumni
American male screenwriters
American television producers
American television writers
Showrunners
American male television writers
University of Illinois College of Fine and Applied Arts alumni
Writers Guild of America Award winners